Kevin Brock (born April 9, 1986) is a former American football tight end. He was signed by the Carolina Panthers as an undrafted free agent in 2009. He played college football at Rutgers.

He has also been a member of the New York Jets, Pittsburgh Steelers, Chicago Bears, Dallas Cowboys, Oakland Raiders, Buffalo Bills, Kansas City Chiefs and Cincinnati Bengals.

Professional career

Carolina Panthers 
After going undrafted in the 2009 NFL Draft, Brock signed with the Carolina Panthers. He was waived on August 2, 2009.

New York Jets 
A day after being waived by Carolina, Brock was claimed by the New York Jets. He was released on September 4.

Pittsburgh Steelers 
Brock was signed to the Pittsburgh Steelers' practice squad on September 16, 2009. He was waived on November 2, 2009.

Chicago Bears 
The Chicago Bears signed Brock to their practice squad on November 24, 2009. On January 4, 2010, he was re-signed to a future contract. He was waived on May 24, 2010.

Dallas Cowboys 
Two days after being waived by Chicago, Brock was signed by the Dallas Cowboys. When the Cowboys suffered injuries to three tight ends, John Phillips, Scott Sicko, and Brock, they needed to sign another tight end. To make room, they waived Brock. He cleared waivers and reverted to Injured Reserve. He reached an injury settlement with the Cowboys on August 25, 2010.

Oakland Raiders 
Brock was signed to the Oakland Raiders' practice squad on September 6, 2010.

Kansas City Chiefs
Brock was signed to the Kansas City Chiefs' roster on September 16, 2013. He was waived on October 29, 2013.

Cincinnati Bengals
Brock was signed to the Cincinnati Bengals' roster on December 31, 2013. The Bengals waived Brock on August 26, 2014.  He was later re-signed by the Bengals. He was released May 10, 2015.

References

External links 
 Carolina Panthers bio
 Oakland Raiders bio

1986 births
Living people
Players of American football from New Jersey
American football tight ends
Rutgers Scarlet Knights football players
Carolina Panthers players
New York Jets players
Pittsburgh Steelers players
Chicago Bears players
Dallas Cowboys players
Oakland Raiders players
Buffalo Bills players
Kansas City Chiefs players
Cincinnati Bengals players
New Orleans Saints players